Necromancing the Stone may refer to:

 "Necromancing the Stone" (Charmed), episode 109 of Charmed
 "Necromancing the Stone" (Legends of Tomorrow), episode 48 of Legends of Tomorrow
 Necromancing the Stone, a 2012 novel by Lish McBride